The 2018–19 USC Trojans women's basketball team represents the University of Southern California during the 2018–19 NCAA Division I women's basketball season. The Trojans, led by second year head coach, 7th overall Mark Trakh, play their home games at the Galen Center and were members of the Pac-12 Conference. They finished the season 17–13, 7–11 in Pac-12 play to finish in a tie for eighth place. They lost in the first round of the Pac-12 women's basketball tournament to Arizona.

Roster

Schedule

|-
!colspan=9 style=| Non-conference regular season

|-
!colspan=9 style=| Pac-12 regular season

|-
!colspan=9 style=| Pac-12 Women's Tournament

Rankings
2018–19 NCAA Division I women's basketball rankings

See also
 2018–19 USC Trojans men's basketball team

References

USC Trojans women's basketball seasons
USC
USC Trojans basketball, women
USC Trojans basketball, women
USC Trojans basketball, women
USC Trojans basketball, women